Ballygally Castle is in the village of Ballygally, County Antrim, Northern Ireland, located approximately  north of Larne. The castle overlooks the sea at the head of Ballygally Bay. Now run as a hotel, it is the only 17th century building still used as a residence in Northern Ireland, and is reputed to be one of the most haunted places in all of Ulster.

Features

The castle is described as "a living postcard—a charming, almost teal-colored Scottish baronial castle overlooking the sea in Northern Ireland."

History
The castle was built in 1625 by James Shaw, of Scotland, who had come to the area and rented the land from the Earl of Antrim for £24 a year. Over the main entrance door to the castle, leading to the tower, is the Middle Scots inscription "Godis Providens is my Inheritans". The bawn and walled garden are registered as Scheduled Historic Monuments at grid ref: D3725 0781.

Reputed hauntings 
The castle is reputed to host a number of ghosts. The small room in the corner turret of the castle is known as "The Ghost Room" and is not used as a room in the hotel.

In 2003, manager Olga Henry had said after spending some time in the hotel, "I'm sort of very skeptical about the whole supernatural thing and ghosts. But the more I stay here and work here, the more I think there's definitely something in this hotel." According to Henry, one guest was staying in one of the rooms in the tower beneath the "Ghost Room" and in the middle of the night he awoke and thought he was at home and one of his children had laid a hand on his back. He woke up and said that he could a hear a child running about the room and laughing but nothing could be seen so he ran into the lobby in his boxers shorts in fright. In December 2003, Henry had set up the "Dungeon Room" in the tower as they were expecting guests and ordered the table neatly in preparation for meal. She locked the room and later checked up on it and the table was now a mess with unfolded napkins and glasses with an unusual scum around them were now arranged in a circle on the table. Mediums spending the night at the castle have often reported that they've detected more ghosts than there were guests actually staying at the hotel.

See also 
Castles in Northern Ireland
List of castles in Ireland

References 

Castles in County Antrim
Grade A listed buildings
Buildings and structures in Larne
1625 establishments in Ireland
Houses completed in 1625
Reportedly haunted locations in Northern Ireland
Hotels in Northern Ireland
Tower houses in Northern Ireland